Dhikpur is a town and Village Development Committee  in Dang Deokhuri District in Lumbini Province of south-western Nepal. At the time of the 1991 Nepal census it had a population of 8,085 persons living in 1112 individual households. It had nine villages. Village Development Committee office was located in Dhikpur village. Now this whole Village Development Committee is merged in Ghorahi sub-metropolitan city.

References

External links
UN map of the municipalities of Dang Deokhuri District

Populated places in Dang District, Nepal